Phillip Eugene Krueger (born June 22, 1951 in Milwaukee, Wisconsin) is a former driver in the CART Championship Car series.  He raced in 9 seasons (1981–1986, 1988–1989, and 1991), with 23 career starts, including the 1986 and 1988 Indianapolis 500.  He finished in the top ten 3 times, with a best finish of 5th position in 1988 at Michigan.

Krueger endured three hard crashes in his open-wheel racing career that left him critically injured--in 1981 during Indy 500 practice, and in 1984 and 1989, both at the Michigan 500--but he would return to racing after every incident.

In 1988 he won the Clint Brawner Mechanical Excellence Award presented annually to the Indianapolis 500 chief mechanic who exemplifies "mechanical and scientific creativity, ingenuity, perseverance, dedication, enthusiasm and expertise" by essentially serving as his own chief mechanic and getting his 2-year old R. Kent Baker Racing March-Cosworth not only into the field, but competitive enough to finish 8th on raceday.

Racing record

SCCA National Championship Runoffs

Complete USAC Mini-Indy Series results

Indy 500 results

References

1951 births
Champ Car drivers
Living people
Indianapolis 500 drivers
Sportspeople from Santa Monica, California
Racing drivers from California